Steubenville High School is a public high school in Steubenville, Ohio, United States. It is the only secondary school in the Steubenville City School District.

Athletics
The school offers baseball, basketball, football, golf, soccer, softball, swimming, tennis, track and field, and wrestling. Athletic teams compete as the Steubenville Big Red in the Ohio High School Athletic Association as a member of the Ohio Valley Athletic Conference.

2012 digital rape case

The school drew international attention after two members of the football team were accused and later convicted of digitally raping a 16-year-old girl in 2012.

Notable alumni and faculty
 Douglas Applegate – U.S. Representative from Ohio (1977–1995)
 Zach Collaros - Quarterback, Cincinnati Bearcats 2009 - 2011 | Current Quarterback for Winnipeg Blue Bombers Canadian Football League, 3 Time Grey Cup Champion, Two Time CFL's Most Outstanding Player Award 2021 & 2022. 
 Sylvia Crawley – Former Boston College women's basketball coach, Current North Carolina Tar Heels Assistant Coach, Crawley was the Starting Center on North Carolina Tar Heels 1994 NCAA Championship Team and Played for Indian Fever and San Antonio Silver Stars of WNBA.
 Joe Gilliam Sr. - All-American at quarterback at West Virginia State University, Tennessee State Tigers Defensive Coordinator, he helped the Tigers to four undefeated seasons and seven Black College Football National Championships in a 20-year span, Gilliam served as head coach at Tennessee State from 1989 to 1992, earning Ohio Valley Conference Coach Of The Year honors in 1990, Gilliam was inducted into the Tennessee Sports Hall Of Fame in 2007.
 Paul Hoover – Kent State University baseball, Tampa Bay Devil Rays, Florida Marlins, Philadelphia Phillies, He is currently the Bench Coach for the Kansas City Royals of Major League Baseball (MLB)
 Calvin Jones – Iowa Hawkeye Football Hall of Fame 1989, # 62 Jersey Retired, Outland Trophy winner (nation’s outstanding college lineman) in 1955; consensus first team all-American guard in 1954, 55; first team all-Big Ten in 1953, 54, 55; captain of 1955 football team; played professional football in Canada in 1956; member of Helms Foundation Hall of Fame; and he was Inducted into College Football Hall of Fame in 1980.
 Don Joyce – Joyce was Drafted in the 2nd Round of the 1951 NFL Draft by the Chicago Cardinals, Played 12 Seasons Chicago (3) Baltimore (7) Min (1) & Den (1) Joyce Started for the Baltimore Colts in both 1958 and 1959 NFL Championship games (Both Won by Colts) and Played in the 1958 Pro Bowl.
 Eddie Kazak – former MLB player (St. Louis Cardinals, Cincinnati Reds)
 Dean Martin – Dean Martin was an American singer, actor, and comedian. One of the most popular and enduring American entertainers of the mid-20th century, Martin was nicknamed "The King of Cool".
 Najee Murray - Defensive Back, Kent State 2013 - 2016 All-Mac | Current Defensive Back for Montreal Alouettes Canadian Football League
 Will Robinson – former head basketball coach at Illinois State University and scout for the Detroit Pistons; first African-American head basketball coach NCAA Division I history
 Edward Vincent – First African American Mayor of the City of Inglewood, CA, All Big Ten and All-American Football Player for Iowa Hawkeyes Football, Drafted by Los Angeles Rams in 1956.
 Moses Fleetwood Walker – The first Openly African American to play in Major League Baseball for Toledo Blue Stockings.
 Weldy Walker – The second Openly African American to play in Major League Baseball for Toledo Blue Stockings.
 Johnny Wilson – former National Football League player for the Cleveland Rams

References

External links
 School website
 District website

High schools in Jefferson County, Ohio
Steubenville, Ohio
School buildings completed in 1949
1949 establishments in Ohio
Educational institutions established in 1949
Public high schools in Ohio